Tom Bresnahan (born October 3, 1965, in Springfield, Massachusetts) was the Offensive coordinator of the NFL's Buffalo Bills from 1992-1996. He was promoted after serving as the team's offensive line coach and would hold both responsibilities.

After the end of the 1996 season, he was stripped of his offensive coordinator title in favor of Dan Henning due to poor performance.

 1963-1968 Williams College OL/DL
 1971 University of Columbia OL
 1973-1980 Naval Academy
 1981-1982 Kansas City Chiefs
 1983-1984 New York Giants OL
 1986-1988 Arizona Cardinals OL
 1989-1991 Buffalo Bills OL
 1992-1996 Buffalo Bills OC
 1997 Buffalo Bills OL
 2006-2009 Massachusetts Maritime Football Consultant

References 

Buffalo Bills coaches
Living people
1935 births